Marumalarchi may refer to:

 Maru Malarchi, a 1998 Indian Tamil-language drama film
 Marumalarchi (1956 film), an Indian Tamil language film